Zhang Heng (AD 78–139) was a Chinese astronomer and mathematician who lived in the early Eastern Han dynasty.

Zhang Heng may also refer to:

 1802 Zhang Heng, an asteroid named after the astronomer
 Zhang Heng (張橫), a minor warlord involved in the Battle of Tong Pass (211) in the late Eastern Han dynasty
 Zhang Heng (Water Margin), a fictional character and one of the 108 outlaws in the novel Water Margin
 Zhang Heng (Taoist), one of the leaders of the Way of the Five Pecks of Rice
 Zhang Heng (rugby player), rugby player who won a medal in rugby sevens at the 2006 Asian Games

See also
 Chang Heng (crater), a lunar crater named after the astronomer

Human name disambiguation pages